Guangdong-Hong Kong Cup 1988–89 is the 11th staging of this two-leg competition between Hong Kong and Guangdong.

The first leg was played in Guangzhou while the second leg was played in Hong Kong on 1 January 1989.

Hong Kong regained the championship by winning an aggregate 4–3 against Guangdong.

Squads

Hong Kong
Some of players in the squads include:
 Chan Shu Ming 陳樹明
 Cheung Chi Tak 張志德
 Lai Lo Kau 賴羅球
 Leung Sui Wing 梁帥榮
 Yu Kwok Sum 余國森
 Lee Kin Wo 李健和
 Leslie George Santos 山度士
 Ku Kam Fai 顧錦輝
 Lai Wing Cheung 黎永昌
 Sze Wai Shan 施維山
 Chan Fat Chi 陳發枝
 Chan Ping On 陳炳安
 Yue Kin Tak 茹健德
 Chan Wai Chiu 陳偉超
 Tim Bredbury 巴貝利
 Law Wai Chi 羅偉志

Guangdong
Guangdong team consists of 17 players.
 Guo Yijun 郭亿军
 Liang Haoxian 梁浩先
 Kong Guoxian 孔国贤
 Mai Chao 麦超
 Ou Chuliang 区楚良
 Xie Yuxin 谢育新
 Wu Qunli 吴群立
 Wu Wenbing 伍文兵
 Zhang Xiaowen 张小文

Trivia
 Hong Kong recaptured the championship after Guangdong won six consecutive times between 1982 and 1988.

Results
First Leg

Second Leg

References
 HKFA website 省港盃回憶錄(五) (in Chinese)

 

Guan
1988-89
1989 in Chinese football